Dr. Katz, Professional Therapist is an American adult animated sitcom created by Jonathan Katz and Tom Snyder for Comedy Central. It originally ran from May 28, 1995 to February 13, 2002. The series starred the voice talents of Jonathan Katz, H. Jon Benjamin, and Laura Silverman. The show was produced by Popular Arts Entertainment, HBO Downtown Productions, and Tom Snyder Productions. The series won a Peabody Award in 1998.

History

Development 
The show was created by Burbank, California, production company Popular Arts Entertainment (executive producers: Tim Braine and David Pritchard), with Jonathan Katz and Tom Snyder, developed and first made by Popular Arts for HBO Downtown Productions. Boston-based Tom Snyder Productions became the hands-on production company, and the episodes were usually produced by Katz and Loren Bouchard.

The show was computer-animated in a crude, easily recognizable style produced with the software Squigglevision (a device Snyder had employed in his educational animation business) in which all persons and animate objects are in color and have constantly squiggling outlines, while most other inanimate objects are static and usually shades of gray. The original challenge Popular Arts faced was how to repurpose recorded stand-up comedy material. To do so, they based Dr. Katz's patients on stand-up comics for the first several episodes, simply having them recite their stand-up acts. The secondary challenge was how to affordably animate on cable TV at the time. Snyder (a boyhood friend of Braine's) had Squigglevision, an inexpensive means of getting animation on cable, which could not afford traditional animation processes. A partnership between Popular Arts, Tom Snyder Productions and Jonathan Katz was formed, and thus, Dr. Katz, Professional Therapist was born.

Show run (1995–2002) 
The first episode of Dr. Katz aired on May 28, 1995. A total of 81 episodes were produced, with the sixth and final season (of 18 episodes) beginning on June 15, 1999. Only the first six of the final season episodes were aired on Comedy Central immediately, though they did air in international markets. After a five-month delay, another nine episodes ran during a Christmas Eve marathon. The final three episodes were broadcast for the first time in the United States on February 13, 2002, during an event dubbed "Dr. Katz goes to the Final Three."

A comic strip of the same name was produced by the Los Angeles Times Syndicate from March 1997 to January 2000. One book collection was published, Hey, I've Got My Own Problems. Writers included Bill Braudis and Dave Blazek, with artwork by Dick Truxaw.

Post-show 
In 2007, Comedy Central presented An Evening with Dr. Katz: Live from the Comedy Central Stage, a live-action special taped in front of a live audience at the Hudson Theater on Santa Monica Boulevard in Los Angeles, featuring Jonathan Katz reprising his role as Dr. Katz. Comedians Maria Bamford, Kathy Griffin, Andy Kindler and Paul F. Tompkins appeared in person as celebrity "clients"; Jon Benjamin and Laura Silverman reprised their respective roles from the animated series. This special was included in the "Complete Series" DVD compilation. In January 2008, live performances were presented over two nights as part of SF Sketchfest in San Francisco, California.  On the first night, Jonathan Katz's guest list included Maria Bamford, Brian Posehn and Bob Odenkirk.  The surprise guest that evening was Robin Williams.  At the end of the "session" Katz revealed that he had multiple sclerosis in real life. On the second night, the clients were Jon Benjamin (reprising his role as Katz's son), Andy Kindler and Eugene Mirman. Show co-creator, Tom Snyder appeared as Katz's therapist, Dr. Snydor. B. J. Novak was not on the announced list.

The show returned to SF Sketchfest in January 2015.  This performance, commemorating the 20th anniversary of the program, featured 
Katz with Jon Benjamin and Tom Snyder again portraying his son and therapist, respectively.  The patients for this production were Ron Funches, Pete Holmes, Morgan Murphy and Emo Philips. Also in 2015, live performances took place at the Moontower Comedy & Oddity Festival in Austin, Texas on April 23 and 24. Staged therapy sessions included Andy Kindler, Emo Philips, Maria Bamford, Dom Irrera, Dana Gould, and Eddie Pepitone. The show was again staged at SF Sketchfest in January 2016.  The patients who booked "appointments" that night included Janeane Garofalo, Andy Kindler, Maria Bamford, The Sklar Brothers, and Chelsea Peretti. As part of the 16th Annual SF Sketchfest, in San Francisco, California there was a live performance on January 20, 2017. Katz did a short stand up comedy set  Guest "patients" included Kevin Pollak, Natasha Leggero, Tom Papa, Moshe Kasher and Scott Aukerman. Leggero joined Kasher's session midway through for couples therapy. The two are married in real life.

The Audio Files
An audio-only version of the show was produced for Audible. The first three episodes were released in June 2017 and were released Thursdays. It ran for 15 episodes. Guests have included Ray Romano, Sarah Silverman, and Ted Danson. A full-length audiobook titled Dr. Katz: The Audiobook was released as an Audible exclusive in 2018 featuring all-new content.

Format
Dr. Katz is a professional psychotherapist. He is a laid-back, well-intentioned man who enjoys playing the guitar and spending time at the bar with his friend Stanley and bartender Julie. Therapy sessions - normally two per episode, with the patients played by well-known comics and actors - anchor the show. Those that feature comics generally consist of onstage material contributed by the guest, while Dr. Katz offers insights or simply lets them talk. Therapy sessions that feature actors contain more interpersonal dialogue between Dr. Katz and his patient.

Interspersed between therapy sessions are scenes involving Dr. Katz's daily life, which includes his aimless, childish 24-year-old son Ben (Jon Benjamin), his uninterested and unhelpful secretary, Laura (Laura Silverman), and his two friends: Stanley (Will LeBow) and bartender Julie, voiced by one of the show's producers, Julianne Shapiro. In later episodes, Todd (Todd Barry), a video store clerk, becomes a regular character.

Most episodes begin with Dr. Katz and Ben at breakfast. The plots include events like Ben attempting to become a radio personality, believing he has ESP, or suffering from a moral conundrum after receiving a chain letter. The development of these plots alternates with the segments of Dr. Katz and his guests in therapy sessions.

Much of the show's content, particularly dialogue between Dr. Katz and Ben, is improvised through a process called "retroscripting", in which a vague outline is developed but the actual dialogue is ad-libbed. This style, as well as the animation technique Squigglevision, would reappear in Home Movies, another series on which many members of the Dr. Katz cast and crew worked.

Episodes

Critical reception 
Season 2 has a score of 81 on Metacritic, based on 6 reviews. The show has won 5 awards, including a Peabody Award and a Daytime Emmy. In 2015, PopMatters asserted that the show was "Still Wise and Just As Funny" as it was when it first aired. In 2016 Jonathan Katz noted "Dr. Katz has such a loyal fan base, even now."

Home media

Books
Eichler, Glenn. Dr. Katz's Me at a Glance, Pocket, 1996. .
Braudis, Bill. Dr. Katz: Hey I've Got My Own Problems, Pocket, 1997. .

References

External links
  at Comedy Central
 
 

 
1995 American television series debuts
2002 American television series endings
1990s American adult animated television series
1990s American sitcoms
1990s American workplace comedy television series
2000s American adult animated television series
2000s American sitcoms
2000s American workplace comedy television series
American adult animated comedy television series
American animated sitcoms
Peabody Award-winning television programs
English-language television shows
Comedy Central animated television series
Comedy Central original programming
Psychotherapy in fiction
Squigglevision
Television series by Soup2Nuts
Television series by HBO Downtown Productions
Television series created by Tom Snyder
Television series about Jews and Judaism
Fictional psychologists